The genus Daphnia (Crustacea: Cladocera: Daphniidae) contains over 200 species of water fleas, many of which are in need of further taxonomic investigation (species inquirendae; marked with asterisks). The species are divided among three subgenera, with a number of species incertae sedis.

Subgenus Australodaphnia Colbourne, Wilson & Hebert, 2006
Daphnia occidentalis Benzie, 1986

Subgenus Ctenodaphnia Dybowski & Grochowski, 1895

Daphnia atkinsoni Baird, 1859
Daphnia australis (Sergeev & Williams, 1985)
Daphnia barbata Weltner, 1898
Daphnia bolivari Richard, 1888
Daphnia brooksi Dodson, 1985
Daphnia carinata King, 1853
Daphnia cephalata King, 1853
Daphnia chevreuxi Richard, 1896
Daphnia chilensis (Hann, 1986)
Daphnia coronata Sars, 1916
Daphnia dadayana Paggi, 1999
Daphnia deserti Gauthier, 1937
Daphnia dolichocephala Sars, 1895
Daphnia ephemeralis (Schwartz & Hebert, 1985)
Daphnia exilis Herrick, 1895
Daphnia fusca Gurney, 1907
Daphnia gelida (Brady, 1918)
Daphnia gibba Methuen, 1910
Daphnia gravis King, 1853*
Daphnia hispanica Glagolev & Alonso, 1990
Daphnia inca Kořínek & Villalobos, 2003
Daphnia jollyi Petkovski, 1973
Daphnia longicephala Hebert, 1977*
Daphnia magna Straus, 1820
Daphnia magniceps Herrick, 1884
Daphnia mediterranea Alonso, 1985
Daphnia menucoensis Paggi, 1996
Daphnia nivalis Hebert, 1977
Daphnia ornithocephala Birabén, 1953
Daphnia paggii Kotov, Sinev & Berrios, 2010
Daphnia projecta Hebert, 1977*
Daphnia pusilla (Serventy, 1929)
Daphnia quadrangula (Sergeev, 1990)
Daphnia queenslandensis (Sergeev, 1990)
Daphnia salina Hebert & Finston, 1993
Daphnia semilumaris Flössner, 1987*
Daphnia similis Claus, 1876
Daphnia similoides Hudec, 1991
Daphnia spinulata Birabén, 1917
Daphnia studeri (Rühe, 1914)
Daphnia thomsoni Sars, 1894*
Daphnia tibetana (Sars, 1903)
Daphnia triquetra Sars, 1903
Daphnia truncata (Hebert & Wilson, 2000)
Daphnia wankeltae Hebert, 1977
Daphnia wardi (Hebert & Wilson, 2000)

Subgenus Daphnia O. F. Müller, 1785

Daphnia ambigua Scourfield, 1947
Daphnia arcuata Forbes, 1893*
Daphnia arenaria Forbes, 1893*
Daphnia arenata Hebert, 1995
Daphnia bairdii Forest, 1879*
Daphnia catawba Coker, 1926
Daphnia caudata Sars, 1863*
Daphnia cavicervix Ekman, 1900
Daphnia cheraphila Hebert & Finston, 1996
Daphnia clathrata Forbes, 1893*
Daphnia commutata Ekman, 1900
Daphnia cristata Sars, 1862
Daphnia cucullata Sars, 1862
Daphnia curvirostris Eylmann, 1887
Daphnia denticulata Birge, 1879*
Daphnia dentifera Forbes, 1893
Daphnia dubia Herrick, 1883
Daphnia elongata Woltereck, 1932*
Daphnia ezoensis Uéno, 1972*
Daphnia frigidolimnetica Ekman, 1904*
Daphnia galeata Sars, 1864
Daphnia gessneri Herbst, 1967
Daphnia gibbera Kortchagin, 1887*
Daphnia hyalina Leydig, 1860
Daphnia intexta Forbes, 1890*
Daphnia lacustris Sars, 1862
Daphnia laevis Birge, 1879
Daphnia latipalpa Moniez, 1888*
Daphnia latispina Kořínek & Hebert, 1996
Daphnia litoralis Sars, 1890*
Daphnia longiremis Sars, 1862
Daphnia longispina (O. F. Müller, 1776)
Daphnia lumholtzi Sars, 1885
Daphnia macraocula Kiser, 1950*
Daphnia marcahuasensis (Valdivia Villar & Burger, 1989)
Daphnia melanica Hebert, 1995
Daphnia mendotae Birge, 1918
Daphnia middendorffiana Fischer, 1851
Daphnia minnehaha Herrick, 1884
Daphnia mitsukuri Ishikawa, 1896*
Daphnia monacha (Brehm, 1912)*
Daphnia morsei Ishikawa, 1895
Daphnia nasuta Herrick, 1884*
Daphnia neoobtusa Hebert, 1995
Daphnia obtusa Kurz, 1874
Daphnia oregonensis Kořínek & Hebert, 1996
Daphnia parapulex Woltereck, 1932*
Daphnia parvula Fordyce, 1901
Daphnia peruviana Harding, 1955
Daphnia pileata Hebert & Finston, 1996
Daphnia prolata Hebert & Finston, 1996
Daphnia propinqua Sars, 1895*
Daphnia pulex Leydig, 1860
Daphnia pulicaria Forbes, 1893
Daphnia pulicarioides Burckhardt, 1899*
Daphnia pulicoides Woltereck, 1932*
Daphnia retrocurva Forbes, 1882
Daphnia rosea Sars, 1862
Daphnia schmackeri Poppe, 1890*
Daphnia schoedleri Sars, 1862*
Daphnia sinevi Kotov, Ishida & Taylor, 2006
Daphnia sonkulensis Manujlova, 1964*
Daphnia tanakai Ishida, Kotov & Taylor, 2006
Daphnia thorata Forbes, 1893
Daphnia titicacensis Birge, 1909*
Daphnia turbinata Sars, 1903
Daphnia typica Mackin, 1931*
Daphnia umbra Taylor et al., 1996
Daphnia ventrosa Kortchagin, 1887*
Daphnia villosa Kořínek & Hebert, 1996
Daphnia whitmani Ishikawa, 1896*
Daphnia zschokkei Stingelin, 1894*

Incertae sedis

Daphnia abrupta Haldeman, 1842*
Daphnia acuminirostris Lucas, 1896*
Daphnia affinis Sars, 1863*
Daphnia alluaudi Richard, 1896*
Daphnia americana Fordyce, 1904*
Daphnia angulata Say, 1818*
Daphnia angulifera Forbes, 1893*
Daphnia balchashensis Manujlova, 1948*
Daphnia berolinensis (Schoedler, 1866)*
Daphnia biwaensis Uéno, 1934*
Daphnia bohemica Burckhardt, 1899*
Daphnia brasiliensis Lubbock, 1854*
Daphnia brevicauda Chambers, 1877*
Daphnia cyclocephala Burckhardt, 1899*
Daphnia decipiens Burckhardt, 1899*
Daphnia degenerata Schmankewitsch, 1875*
Daphnia dolichocantha (Dybowsky & Grochowski, 1895)*
Daphnia dorsalis Rafinesque, 1817*
Daphnia echinata Schmarda, 1854*
Daphnia ephippiata Koch, 1841*
Daphnia eurycephala (Daday, 1911)*
Daphnia expansa Sars, 1914*
Daphnia foreli Burckhardt, 1899*
Daphnia friedeli Hartwig, 1897*
Daphnia granaria Nicolet, 1849*
Daphnia gravis Schödler, 1877*
Daphnia hamata Brady, 1898*
Daphnia heuscheri Burckhardt, 1899*
Daphnia himalaya Manca, Martin, Peñalva-Arana & Benzie, 2006*
Daphnia hodgsoni Sars, 1916*
Daphnia honorata King, 1853*
Daphnia hybus Ross, 1897*
Daphnia insulana Moniez, 1889*
Daphnia intermedia (Studer, 1878)*
Daphnia izpodvala Kotov & Taylor, 2010
Daphnia juvensis Burckhardt, 1899*
Daphnia katrajensis Rane, Jafri & Rafiq, 1992*
Daphnia kerusses Cox, 1883*
Daphnia kingi Schödler, 1877*
Daphnia kirimensis Weltner, 1898*
Daphnia kisilkumensis Schödler, 1877*
Daphnia lamellata Sars, 1914*
Daphnia leucocephala Sars, 1903*
Daphnia leydigi P. E. Müller, 1867*
Daphnia longicornis Sars, 1890*
Daphnia macrura Dana, 1852*
Daphnia major Brady, 1898*
Daphnia melanea Dufresne & Hebert, 1994*
Daphnia minnesotensis Herrick, 1895*
Daphnia mirabilis Stingelin, 1915*
Daphnia neglecta Burckhardt, 1899*
Daphnia newporti Baird, 1859*
Daphnia notodonvarani Zacharias, 1905*
Daphnia pacifica Taylor, Finston & Hebert, 1998*
Daphnia palaearctica Behning, 1928*
Daphnia procumbens Sars, 1890*
Daphnia psittacea Baird, 1850*
Daphnia pusilla (Sars, 1890)*
Daphnia ramosa Koch, 1841*
Daphnia reticulata Haldeman, 1843*
Daphnia richardi Burckhardt, 1899*
Daphnia rotundata Say, 1818*
Daphnia rotundata Burckhardt, 1899*
Daphnia rudis Schmankewitsch, 1875*
Daphnia sarsi (Langhans, 1911)*
Daphnia serrulata Daday, 1884*
Daphnia silvestrii Daday, 1902*
Daphnia sima Schödler, 1863*
Daphnia simulans Sars, 1903*
Daphnia spinosa Herrick, 1879*
Daphnia stenocephala (Daday, 1911)*
Daphnia tarasca Kraus, 1986*
Daphnia tenuirostris Sars, 1890*
Daphnia tenuispina Sars, 1916*
Daphnia textilis Dana, 1852*
Daphnia ulomskyi Behning, 1941*
Daphnia variabilis Langhans, 1911*
Daphnia ventricosa Hellich, 1877*
Daphnia vernalis Sars, 1890*
Daphnia wierzejskii Richard, 1896*
Daphnia wierzejskii Lityński, 1913*

References

Cladocera
Daphnia